This is a list of national days of mourning before 2000. It does not include annual remembrance events.

17th century

18th century

19th century

1900s

1910s

1920s

1930s

1940s

1950s

1960s

1970s

1980s

1990s

See also 
 National day of mourning
 European Day of Mourning, a similar concept at the EU level

References 

Death customs
Mourning (0000-)
Lists of disasters